Rafael Waldemar Erich (10 June 1879 in Turku – 19 February 1946 in Helsinki) was a Finnish politician from the National Coalition Party, Professor, diplomat, and Prime Minister of Finland.

The sixth cabinet of the Republic of Finland, Erich's cabinet, lasted from 15 March 1920 to 9 April 1921 for a total of 391 days.

The most important function and accomplishment of Erich's cabinet was a peace treaty with the Russian SFSR. The peace treaty was made in Tartu, Estonia, on 14 October 1920. This was the time when the Russian SFSR finally completely recognised Finland's independence.

Cabinets
Erich Cabinet

References

1879 births
1946 deaths
People from Turku
People from Turku and Pori Province (Grand Duchy of Finland)
Young Finnish Party politicians
National Coalition Party politicians
Prime Ministers of Finland
Members of the Parliament of Finland (1919–22)
Members of the Parliament of Finland (1922–24)
Permanent Representatives of Finland to the League of Nations
Finnish legal scholars
University of Helsinki alumni
Academic staff of the University of Helsinki